The list of acts of the 106th United States Congress includes all Acts of Congress and ratified treaties by the 106th United States Congress, which lasted from January 3, 1999 to January 3, 2001.

Acts include public and private laws, which are enacted after being passed by Congress and signed by the President, however if the President vetoes a bill it can still be enacted by a two-thirds vote in both houses. The Senate alone considers treaties, which are ratified by a two-thirds vote.

The number of women representatives who served in the 106th Congress was twice the number of women representatives who served in the 101st Congress.

Summary of actions
President William J. Clinton vetoed the following acts of this Congress.

Public laws

Private laws

Treaties
No treaties have been enacted this Congress.

See also 
List of United States federal legislation
List of acts of the 105th United States Congress
List of acts of the 107th United States Congress

References

External links

 Authenticated Public and Private Laws from the Federal Digital System
 Legislation & Records Home: Treaties from the Senate
 Private Laws for the 106th Congress at Congress.gov
 Public Laws for the 106th Congress at Congress.gov

 
106